Cladonia bellidiflora or the toy soldiers cup lichen is a  fruticose, cup lichen species in the Cladoniaceae family.

See also
List of Cladonia species

References

bellidiflora
Lichen species
Lichens of North America
Taxa named by Erik Acharius
Lichens described in 1799